Eliot Spizzirri and Tyler Zink won the boys' doubles tennis title at the 2019 US Open, defeating Andrew Paulson and Alexander Zgirovsky in the final, 7–6(7–4), 6–4.

Adrian Andreev and Anton Matusevich were the defending champions, but chose not to participate.

Seeds

Draw

Finals

Top half

Bottom half

External links 
 Main draw

Boys' Doubles
US Open, 2019 Boys' Doubles